The women's singles event at the 2018 South American Games was held from 28 May to 2 June.

Medalists

Draw

Final four

Top half

Bottom half

External links
Draw

Women's singles
South